Get Loud is the fourth studio album by Australian recording artist Adam Brand. The album was released in August 2004 and peaked at number 16 on the ARIA charts. It was certified gold in 2005.

The album was nominated for ARIA Award for Best Country Album at the ARIA Music Awards of 2004

Track listing

Charts

Weekly charts

Year-end charts

Certifications

Release history

References

2004 albums
Adam Brand (musician) albums
Sony Music Australia albums